The Agnes Irving was an iron paddle steamer built in 1862 at Charles Lungley's Dockyard, Deptford Green on the River Thames, London. It was wrecked on 28 December 1879, when it entered the Macleay River on ebb tide whilst carrying general cargo from Sydney, and was lost off the South Spit of the old entrance of Trial Bay, New South Wales.

References

Shipwrecks of the Mid North Coast Region
Ships built in Deptford
1862 ships
Maritime incidents in December 1879
1851–1870 ships of Australia
1871–1900 ships of Australia
Merchant ships of Australia
Paddle steamers of Australia
Water transport in New South Wales